Wílber Mauricio Wright Reynolds (born 20 December 1970 in San José, Costa Rica) is a Costa Rican former professional footballer who played as a defender. He was a key member of the Costa Rica national team for over ten years.

Club career
Wright started his career at the academies of Saprissa, where in 1992 he was promoted to the first team. He moved abroad to play for Comunicaciones in Guatemala, where he played alongside compatriots Rolando Fonseca, Floyd Guthrie and Jéwisson Bennett. He then played three seasons (1999–2001) in Major League Soccer, split between the San Jose Clash (later Earthquakes) and the New England Revolution, alongside William Sunsing. He scored six goals and added three assists in MLS league play. Wright has also had a brief spell at Herediano. His performances in the World Cup in the summer of 2002 attracted the people of AEK Athens who signed him immediately after alongside his compatriot, Walter Centeno. He performed very well, while also playing in the UEFA Champions League scoring the winner against APOEL on the qualifiers on 28 August 2002. His contract with the club had a duration of 3 years, however he files an appeal and was released after some issues with the administration about his salary. He also had a short stint in China with Shenyang Ginde. With Saprissa, he has won three national championships and two CONCACAF Champions Cup, and returned to the team to play his last season as a professional, accomplishing his dream of retiring as a 'morado'.

International career
Wright made his debut for Costa Rica national football team at the December 1995 UNCAF Nations Cup match against Belize and earned a total of 67 caps, scoring 6 goals. After not playing in qualifying rounds, he started in the 2002 FIFA World Cup, scoring a goal. He also played (and scored) in the 1997 and 2004 Copa Américas.

His final international was a July 2005 CONCACAF Gold Cup match against Cuba.

Managerial career
Wright was named manager of Brujas in May 2007 and he won the 2009 winter championship with the club. He has coached teams in Costa Rica and Guatemala and took the reins at Cartaginés in May 2014. He was announced the new manager at Herediano in December 2014, replacing Jafet Soto. In May 2021, he won the Clausura season with Saprissa, thus giving the team its record 36th title.

Honours

Sarprissa
Primera División de Costa Rica: 1993–94, 1994–95, 1997–98, 2006–07
CONCACAF Champions' Cup: 1993, 1995
Central American Club Championship: 1998, 2007
CONCACAF Gold Cup Best XI: 2003

References

External links
 

1970 births
Living people
Footballers from San José, Costa Rica
Costa Rican footballers
Association football defenders
Deportivo Saprissa players
Comunicaciones F.C. players
San Jose Earthquakes players
New England Revolution players
C.S. Herediano footballers
AEK Athens F.C. players
Changsha Ginde players
Liga FPD players
Major League Soccer players
Major League Soccer All-Stars
Super League Greece players
Costa Rica international footballers
1997 Copa América players
1998 CONCACAF Gold Cup players
2002 FIFA World Cup players
2003 CONCACAF Gold Cup players
2004 Copa América players
2005 CONCACAF Gold Cup players
Copa Centroamericana-winning players
Costa Rican expatriate footballers
Costa Rican expatriate sportspeople in the United States
Costa Rican expatriate sportspeople in Greece
Costa Rican expatriate sportspeople in China
Expatriate soccer players in the United States
Expatriate footballers in Greece
Expatriate footballers in China
Costa Rican football managers
C.S. Herediano managers
Puntarenas F.C. managers
C.S.D. Municipal managers
Costa Rican expatriate football managers
Costa Rican expatriate sportspeople in Guatemala
Expatriate football managers in Guatemala
Costa Rican people of Jamaican descent